Bernard Ringeissen (born 15 May 1934) is a French classical pianist.

He was born in Paris in 1934.  His first teacher, at age 7, was Georges de Lausnay.  He entered the Conservatoire National Supérieur de Musique in 1947, aged 12, and won the Premier Prix when he was sixteen.  He had further study with Marguerite Long and Jacques Février. In 1953, he temporarily retired from public performance, to focus on music competition.

In 1954, he won equal 2nd Prize with Sergio Scopelliti at the Alfredo Casella Competition in Naples. He also won the International Music Performance Competition in Geneva that year. In 1955, he won 4th prize at the V International Chopin Piano Competition in Warsaw; then equal 2nd Prize with Dimitri Bashkirov at the Marguerite Long-Jacques Thibaud International Competition (no 1st Prize was awarded that year).  In 1962, he won 1st Prize at the Rio de Janeiro International Competition and the Villa-Lobos Special Prize for his interpretation of Brazilian music.

He has performed widely and served on competition juries in many countries.  He teaches in Rueil-Malmaison, and gives master-classes at the Salzburg Mozarteum and at the International Summer Seminar in Weimar.

His recordings include the complete piano works of Camille Saint-Saëns and of Igor Stravinsky, and many works by Charles-Valentin Alkan, Frédéric Chopin, Claude Debussy (with Noël Lee), and the Russian masters. He has also recorded Poulenc's Concerto in D minor for Two Pianos and Orchestra, with Gabriel Tacchino and the Monte-Carlo Philharmonic Orchestra under Georges Prêtre.

References 

1934 births
Living people
Musicians from Paris
21st-century French male classical pianists
20th-century French male classical pianists
Conservatoire de Paris alumni
Prize-winners of the International Chopin Piano Competition
Long-Thibaud-Crespin Competition prize-winners